The Fifteen Promises is a tradition held by the Order of Preachers (also known as Dominicans) that the Blessed Virgin Mary made fifteen specific promises through Dominic de Guzmán and Alan de Rupe, to those who faithfully pray the Rosary. The fifteen stated promises range from protection from misfortune to meriting a high degree of glory in heaven.

History

Alanus de Rupe (Alain de la Roche) was a 15th-century Dominican preacher, best known for his efforts to promote the Rosary. Alanus claimed to have experienced a vision by which it was revealed to him that the Blessed Virgin Mary had appeared to St. Dominic and gave him the Rosary as a means to combat the Albigensian movement. Alanus de Rupe's revelation concerning St. Dominic and the Rosary was generally accepted until the 17th century when the Bollandists concluded that the account of Dominic's supposed apparition of Our Lady of the Rosary is not mentioned in any documents of the Church or Dominican Order prior to the accounts of Alanus over two hundred years later.

A popular prayer card listing the promises bears the imprimatur ("let it be printed") of Patrick J. Hayes DD who was Archbishop of New York from 1919 to 1938. It was issued after a finding of "nihil obstat" (nothing obstructs) by an archdiocesan censor who reviewed the material to determine if it contradicted Catholic teaching. Neither a "nihil obstat" nor an "imprimatur" would necessarily reflect the personal opinion of either the censor or the archbishop regarding the document reviewed. Hayes' predecessor, John Cardinal Farley, issued an imprimatur for the edition of the Catholic Encyclopedia that holds the Rosary promises as not historical.

The 15 promises fall under the category of "private revelation", and as such are a pious tradition, which a person is free to believe or not believe.

 Whoever shall faithfully serve me by the recitation of the Rosary, shall receive signal graces.
 I promise my special protection and the greatest graces to all those who shall recite the Rosary.
 The Rosary shall be a powerful armor against hell, it will destroy vice, decrease sin, and defeat heresies.
 It will cause virtue and good works to flourish; it will obtain for souls the abundant mercy of God; it will withdraw the heart of men from the love of the world and its vanities, and will lift them to the desire of eternal things. Oh, that souls would sanctify themselves by this means.
 The soul which recommends itself to me by the recitation of the Rosary shall not perish.
 Whoever shall recite the Rosary devoutly, applying himself to the consideration of its sacred mysteries, shall never be conquered and never overwhelmed by misfortune. God will not chastise him in His justice, he shall not perish by an unprovided death (unprepared for heaven). The sinner shall convert. The just shall grow in grace and become worthy of eternal life.
 Whoever shall have a true devotion for the Rosary shall not die without the sacraments of the Church.
 Those who are faithful to recite the Rosary shall have, during their life and at their death, the light of God and the plenitude of His graces; at the moment of death they shall participate in the merits of the saints in paradise.
 I shall deliver from purgatory those who have been devoted to the Rosary.
 The faithful children of the Rosary shall merit a high degree of glory in heaven.
 You shall obtain all you ask of me by the recitation of the Rosary.
 All those who propagate the Holy Rosary shall be aided by me in their necessities.
 I have obtained from my Divine Son that all the advocates of the Rosary shall have for intercessors the entire celestial court during their life and at the hour of death.
 All who recite the Rosary are my sons, and brothers of my only son Jesus Christ.
 Devotion of my Rosary is a great sign of predestination.

See also

 Prayer in the Catholic Church
 Rosary devotions and spirituality

References

External links
Fifteen Rosary Promises, Marian Library, University of Dayton

Roman Catholic prayers
Rosary